The Simeone Foundation Automotive Museum is an automotive museum located at 6825 Norwitch Drive in Philadelphia, Pennsylvania. The museum's collection consists of approximately 75 racing sports cars and has been assembled over more than 50 years by Frederick A. Simeone, a retired neurosurgeon and native of Philadelphia.
Frederick Simeone has been ranked the #1 car collector by the Classic Car Trust Registry.

History
Frederick Simeone's father was a general practitioner who ran his medical practice out of a rowhouse in the Kensington section of Philadelphia. When his father died in 1972, Simeone was left with $8,000 and 4 cars which were stored in a garage on Clearfield Street. He grew this collection over the next four decades, and in 2008 he donated the entire collection of cars to the museum's foundation, which now owns the titles to the cars. From 1982 until the Museum's opening in June 2008, the cars were stored in a garage near 8th and Lombard Streets in Philadelphia.

Dr. Simeone passed away at the age of 86 on June 11, 2022.

Criteria for inclusion

The museum has several criteria for inclusion into the collection:

 The car must be a sports car with headlights and fenders.
 The car must have a history of road racing (not solely racing on a track).
 The car must be considered significant, or "winners" associated with superior racing performance.
 Important components, such as the chassis, engine, and body, must be original to the car.

Demonstration Days program

The museum conducts a Demonstration Days program twice per month, where several cars are moved to the 3-acre parking lot behind the museum. The program consists of a themed educational presentation followed by a driving demonstration where the cars are operated by the museum curator. Upon conclusion of the Demonstration Days program, museum guests are permitted to inspect and photograph the cars.

Library
The museum has a library containing a collection of automotive literature, documents and sales brochures dating back to 1892. The collection was formerly held in boxes in a building in Center City Philadelphia, and was moved into the museum's newly constructed library in 2013. Due to the fragility of the materials, the library and collection are not open to the public.

Exhibits and collection

The Simeone Foundation Automotive Museum consists of 21 exhibits and 70 cars in the permanent collection. The cars are arranged chronologically and in diorama vignettes. Several motor racing venues are represented as exhibits, including Le Mans, Nürburgring, Sebring, Bonneville, Watkins Glen, Brooklands, Mille Miglia and Targa Florio. The museum's collection has been called "one of the finest collections of rare and important racing sports cars in the world". Nearly every car in the collection has its original body. Most of the cars are currently in drivable condition. The museum uses aviation gasoline in the car since it is more stable than regularly available gasoline, and it still contains some lead. Lead is essential as an anti-knock compound in order to operate these older engines.

List of exhibits and cars:

Publications 

The Spirit of Competition - Coachbuilt Press, 2009
The Stewardship of Historically Important Automobiles - Coachbuilt Press, 2012

Awards won 
 2019 #1 Ranking of the Top 100 Classic Car Collectors 
 2017 International Historic Motoring Awards "Museum or Collection of the Year" 
 2014 International Historic Motoring Awards "Car of the Year" - 1964 Shelby Cobra Daytona Coupe
 2014 Historic Vehicle Association: 1st automobile added to National Historic Vehicle Register - 1964 Shelby Cobra Daytona Coupe
 2012 International Historic Motoring Awards "Publication of the Year" - The Stewardship of Historically Important Automobiles
 2011 International Historic Motoring Awards "Museum of the Year"

Spirit of Competition Award 

The "Spirit of Competition" is the theme of the museum and the title of an annual award given a person from the world of motorsports.

Past recipients of the award include:

2008 Mario Andretti
2009 Janet Guthrie
2010 John Fitch
2011 Craig Breedlove
2012 Sam Posey
2013 Hurley Haywood
2014 Bobby Rahal
2015 David Hobbs
2016 Peter Brock
2017 Derek Bell
2018 Roger Penske

References

External links
The Collection | Simeone Foundation Automotive Museum
Demo Days | Simeone Foundation Automotive Museum

Museums in Philadelphia
Automobile museums in Pennsylvania
Museums established in 2008
Southwest Philadelphia
2008 establishments in Pennsylvania